Evald Vassilievich Ilyenkov (18 February 1924 – 21 March 1979) was a Marxist author and Soviet philosopher.

Biography 
Evald Ilyenkov did original work on the materialist development of Hegel's dialectics, notable for his account of concrete universals. His works include Dialectical Logic (Russian, 1974; English trans. 1977), Leninist Dialectics and the Metaphysics of Positivism (Russian, 1980 (posthum.); English trans. 1982) and The Dialectics of the Abstract and Concrete in Marx's Capital (Russian, 1960; English trans. 1982). Ilyenkov committed suicide in 1979.

David Bakhurst wrote in his article; "Meaning, Normativity and the Life of Mind":

An abridged version of his article, "Marx and the Western World," was published in English in a book of the same name in 1967, but this work is little known.

On the other hand, Ilyenkov's work (especially his masterpiece, the study on Dialectics of the Abstract and the Concrete in Marx's Capital from 1960, and the collection of essays entitled Dialectical Logic from 1974) deeply influenced the reception of Marx' economic writings from the 1960s onwards, in the Soviet Union and the GDR as well as in the West. His influence can be witnessed in the international research effort concerned with the publication of Marx' economic manuscripts (in Marx/Engels: Gesamtausgabe, or MEGA, section II, 1976 ff.). His influence is also evident in the intense debates on economic reform that was going on in the Soviet Union in the 1970s (e.g., in the works of A. K. Pokrytan).

Ilyenkov's works have been published in about 20 languages. His Dialectical Logic (1974) was published in English by Progress Publishers in Moscow in 1977. A German translation of his Dialectics of the Abstract and the Concrete in Marx’s Capital (1960), was published by the same publisher in 1979 (and simultaneously by Das europäische Buch, West Berlin); an English translation of the book was published by Progress Publishers in Moscow in 1982. Leninist Dialectics and the Metaphysics of Positivism (first published in Russian in 1980) was published by New Park Publications in 1982.

Bibliography (English translations) 
Books:
2018. Intelligent Materialism: Essays on Hegel and Dialectics
1960. Dialectics of the Abstract & the Concrete in Marx’s Capital
1974. Dialectical Logic, Essays on its History and Theory
1979. Leninist Dialectics and the Metaphysics of Positivism

Articles:
1974. Activity and Knowledge
1974. From the Marxist-Leninist Point of View
1974. The Universal
1974. A Contribution to a Conversation About Esthetic Education
1975. A Contribution to a Conversation About Meshcheriakov
1975. Humanism and Science
1976. Dialectics of the Ideal
1977. Concept of the Ideal
1979. The problem of contradiction in logic (fragment)
1979. Materialism Is Militant and Therefore Dialectical
Date unknown. Psychology
Date unknown. Our Schools Must Teach How to Think!
Date unknown. A Contribution to the Discussion on School Education
Date unknown. On the Nature of Ability
Date unknown. The Biological and the Social in Man
Date unknown. A Contribution on the Question of the Concept of “Activity” and Its Significance for Pedagogy
Date unknown. Knowledge and Thinking
Date unknown. Ideals (Social, Esthetic, Moral)
Date unknown. Mind and Brain (An Answer to D. I. Dubrovskii)
Date unknown. The Question of the Identity of Thought and Being in Pre-Marxist Philosophy

See also
 Philosophy in the Soviet Union
 Aleksandr Zinovyev
 Merab Mamardashvili
 György Lukács
 Lev Vygotsky
 Bertell Ollman

References
 Ilyenkov, E.V., The Ideal in Human Activity, includes "Dialectical Logic" and essays on the ideal and activity, such as “The Universal,” "Activity and Knowledge" and “The Concept of the Ideal,” published by Erythrospress, see Erythrospress.com/Ilyenkov

Further reading 
Dialectics of the Ideal: Evald Ilyenkov and Creative Soviet Marxism (Historical Materialism Book Series) by Alex Levant
Evald Ilyenkov's Philosophy Revisited, (Kikimora publications) by Vesa Oittinen (Dec 2000)
Consciousness and Revolution in Soviet Philosophy: From the Bolsheviks to Evald Ilyenkov, by David Bakhurst (Jun 28, 1991)
E. Ilyenkov and the Deaf-Blind Children:Soviet Psychologists Show Pavlov the Door, by Susan Welsh (1977).
Spinoza, Ilyenkov & Western Marxism – meeting the challenges of the global crisis, by Corinna Lotz and Penny Cole (2012).
On trends in the status of dialectical logic: A brief study of Lefebvre, Ilyenkov and Wald, by Claude M. J. Braun (1989)
A philosopher under suspicion, by Sergey Mareev (1990)
Review of E.V. Ilyenkov, "The Ideal in Human Activity", by Alex Levant (2011)
Symbols, tools, and ideality in Ilyenkov, by Peter Jones (1998)
Ideality, Symbols, and the Mind(Response to David Bakhurst), by Peter Jones (1998?)
Re-reading Soviet philosophy: Bakhurst on Ilyenkov, by Brendan Larvor (1992)
Lessons from Ilyenkov, by David Bakhurst (1995)
Review-essay: From the History of Soviet Philosophy: Lukacs-Vygotsky-Ilyenkov, by Alex Levant (2011)
From the History of Soviet Philosophy: Lukács – Vygotsky – Ilyenkov, by Sergey Mareev, Moscow:Kul’turnaia revoliutsiia, 2008 [Russian]
About the Last Soviet Marxist, by Aleksey Tsvetkov (2013) [Russian]
E.V. Ilyenkov and Creative Soviet Theory: An Introduction to Dialectics of the Ideal, by Alex Levant (2012)
Evald Ilyenkov’s  Cosmology: The Point of Madness of Dialectical Materialism, by Slavoj Žižek
Finding Evald Ilyenkov: How a Soviet philosopher who stood up for dialectics continues to inspire, by Corinna Lotz (2019)

External links
Evald Ilyenkov Archive at Marxist Internet Archive
Biography including Archive of Writings in English/Russian
Evald Ilyenkov in the Gallery of Russian Thinkers
A Philosopher Under Suspicion by Sergei Mareyev
International Friends of Ilyenkov https://ilyenkovfriends.org/

1924 births
1979 suicides
20th-century Russian philosophers
Materialists
Marxist theorists
Russian communists
Russian Marxists
Russian people of World War II
Soviet military personnel of World War II
Soviet philosophers
Suicides in the Soviet Union
Spinoza scholars
Spinozist philosophers
1979 deaths